Badminton at the 2003 All-Africa Games was held from October 4 to 18, 2003 in Abuja, Nigeria.

Venue
Indoor Sports Halls National Stadium, in Abuja, Nigeria.

Medalists

Medal count

References
Africa Badminton

2003 All-Africa Games
2003
All-Africa Games
Badminton tournaments in Nigeria